Ana Živojinović (née Lazarević; born July 4, 1991) is a professional volleyball player from Serbia, who was a member of the Serbia women's national volleyball team that won the gold medal at the 2011 European Championship in Serbia and Italy. At club level, she plays for OK Crvena zvezda Belgrade in Serbian Volley league.

Career
Ana Lazarević took her first steps in volleyball in 2005, in the Academy of Srbijanka of Valjevo, a club of her hometown. In Servjianka she remained for only a year, since in 2006 she was transferred to Vizoura Belgrade. She remained for six years in the club of the Serbian capital, took the second place of the 2010-11 Serbian Championship, and was runners up of the Cup of Serbia in the same year as well.
In 2012 she decided to leave her homeland and travel to Turkey for Besiktas Istanbul, but she remained there for just one season.

In 2013, Ana Lazarević was signed by ASPTT Mulhouse, a team of the town with the same name in France, where she remained for two years. With ASPTT Mulhouse she was awarded as Best Receiver in the 2014 edition of CEV Women's Challenge Cup, in the third place of her team in that year's competition.

In the summer of 2015, Lazarević moved to Greece and was transferred to Olympiacos Piraeus, where she remained until the summer of 2017. With the Red-whites of Piraeus she won the double twice (Hellenic Championship and Hellenic Cup) in the 2015–16 and 2016–17 seasons. Moreover, she was named the Most Valuable Player (M.V.P.) at the 2017 Hellenic Cup.
At the same season she was runner up of the European Challenge Cup, in the incredible course of Olympiacos to the final of the competition.

After one year in Beylikdüzü of Istanbul for personal reasons, she moved in 2018 to Romanian Alba Blaj, with which she won both the Romanian championship and Cup, but also the Silver Medal of 2018–19 Women's CEV Cup.

In the summer of 2019, Ana Lazarevic returned to Greece, to Olympiacos Piraeus as Ana Živojinović, after marrying water polo player Stefan Živojinović, who was also transferred to Olympiacos that same year.

In May 2021, after one year of absence due to pregnancy, she returned to Serbia and signed for OK Crvena zvezda Belgrade, club that she support since childhood.

International career
Ana Lazarević has been a member of the Serbian National Team since 2011. She has 30 entries (July 2015) and she has won two gold medals in European competitions as well as the bronze medal at the 2013 Volleyball World Grand Prix.

Sporting achievements

National Team
 2011  Women's European Volleyball Championship (Serbia / Italy)
 2011  Women's European Volleyball League (Istanbul)
 2013  FIVB World Grand Prix (Sapporo)

Clubs

International competitions
 2013/2014  CEV Women's Challenge Cup, with ASPTT Mulhouse
 2016/2017  CEV Women's Challenge Cup, with Olympiacos Piraeus
 2018/2019  Women's CEV Cup, with CSM Volei Alba Blaj

National championships
 2015/2016  Hellenic Championship, with Olympiacos Piraeus
 2016/2017  Hellenic Championship, with Olympiacos Piraeus
 2018/2019  Romanian Championship, with CSM Volei Alba Blaj

National trophies
 2015/2016  Hellenic Cup, with Olympiacos Piraeus
 2016/2017  Hellenic Cup, with Olympiacos Piraeus
 2018/2019  Romanian Cup, with CSM Volei Alba Blaj

Individuals
 2014 CEV Women's Challenge Cup: Best receiver
 2017 Hellenic Cup Final four: M.V.P.

References

External links
 profile at Olympiacos official site www.olympiacossfp.gr  
 profile at FIVB official site
 Olympiacos at CEV web site (2017)  www.cev.eu
 profile at volleybox.net
 profile at CEV site

1991 births
Living people
Sportspeople from Valjevo
Olympiacos Women's Volleyball players
Serbian women's volleyball players
European champions for Serbia
Serbian expatriate sportspeople in Turkey
Serbian expatriate sportspeople in France
Serbian expatriate sportspeople in Greece
Serbian expatriate sportspeople in Romania
Expatriate volleyball players in Romania